Illinois Route 251 is a north–south state highway that runs on the former alignment of U.S. Route 51 before Interstate 39 was built in north central Illinois. It runs from U.S. 51 at the border with Wisconsin to I-39 and U.S. 51 south of Kappa.

Route description 

Illinois 251 runs parallel to Interstate 39 and U.S. 51 for most of the length of I-39 in Illinois. Like Illinois Route 351, it can be considered a spur, loop or alternate of its parent route, U.S. 51.

The road parallels the east bank of the Rock River through Rockford, where the highway goes north on Eleventh Street, west on Harrison, north on Kishwaukee, west on Walnut then split between northbound Third and southbound Second through downtown Rockford.  After downtown, both directions take the southbound lanes' Second Street name as a divided urban expressway (also badged as Martin Luther King Jr. Memorial Drive) for a couple of miles north of downtown Rockford.  It stays Second Street through Loves Park, Machesney Park and Roscoe until its north endpoint at US 51 and Illinois 75 in South Beloit

History 
Illinois 251 was established in 1982 when first segment of I-39 opened between Rockford and Bloomington. In 1992, the final segment of I-39 opened north of Bloomington. The remaining stretch of former U.S. 51 became Illinois 251. The initial designation of I-39 was U.S. Route 51 until 1992.

Major intersections

References

External links 
 Illinois Highway Ends: Illinois Route 251

251
251
Transportation in McLean County, Illinois
Transportation in Woodford County, Illinois
Transportation in Marshall County, Illinois
Transportation in LaSalle County, Illinois
Transportation in Lee County, Illinois
Transportation in Ogle County, Illinois
Transportation in Winnebago County, Illinois
Transportation in Rockford, Illinois